Chitikila Musili was an Indian mathematician at the University of Hyderabad who developed standard monomial theory in collaboration with his PhD supervisor C. S. Seshadri.

Publications

References

20th-century Indian mathematicians